Peter Grünberger (born 20 November 1962) is a retired German football midfielder.

References

External links
 

1962 births
Living people
German footballers
Bundesliga players
2. Bundesliga players
FC Bayern Munich footballers
FC Bayern Munich II players
VfL Bochum players
SG Union Solingen players
Association football midfielders